The 1985 season was the first season of existence for the second incarnation of the Portland Timbers. The club was then branded as F.C. Portland for the season and competed in the Western Alliance Challenge Series. Including the first Timbers franchise, this was the ninth season all together.

Western Alliance Challenge Series

Standings

League results 

Source.

References 

1985
American soccer clubs 1985 season
1985 in sports in Oregon
1985 in Portland, Oregon